Peter Jacob Harrold (born June 8, 1983) is an American former professional ice hockey defenseman who played in the National Hockey League (NHL) for the Los Angeles Kings and the New Jersey Devils.

Playing career
Harrold was raised in the suburbs of Cleveland, Ohio where he attended Hawken School. Upon graduation from high school, Harrold attended Boston College where he was the captain of their team. Led by Harrold, BC made it to the 2006 Frozen Four where they played the Wisconsin Badgers. He scored his first career NHL goal on February 23, 2008, against the Chicago Blackhawks' Patrick Lalime at Staples Center. Harrold represented the United States at the 2009 IIHF World Championship.

On August 12, 2011, he signed a one-year, two-way deal with the New Jersey Devils.

After four seasons within the Devils' organization, Harrold left as a free agent and signed a one-year, two-way contract with the St. Louis Blues on July 2, 2015. After attending the Blues 2015 training camp, he was assigned to AHL affiliate, the Chicago Wolves for the duration of the 2015–16 season. Adding a veteran presence to the Wolves' blueline, Harrold posted 1 goal and 23 assists for 24 points in 70 games to end his 10 year professional career.

Personal life
Harrold's wife, Casey, is the daughter of former NFL wide receiver Dwight Clark.

Career statistics

Regular season and playoffs

International

Awards and honors

References

External links
 

1983 births
Living people
Albany Devils players
American men's ice hockey defensemen
Boston College Eagles men's ice hockey players
Chicago Wolves players
Ice hockey players from Ohio
Los Angeles Kings players
Manchester Monarchs (AHL) players
New Jersey Devils players
People from Lake County, Ohio
Undrafted National Hockey League players
Hawken School alumni
AHCA Division I men's ice hockey All-Americans